Eduard "Edy" Schmid (May 3, 1911 – September 25, 2000) was a Swiss field handball player who competed in the 1936 Summer Olympics.

He was part of the Swiss field handball team, which won the bronze medal. He played three matches as goalkeeper, winning once.

References

External links
profile

1911 births
2000 deaths
Swiss male handball players
Olympic handball players of Switzerland
Field handball players at the 1936 Summer Olympics
Olympic bronze medalists for Switzerland
Olympic medalists in handball
Medalists at the 1936 Summer Olympics